Collected Poems in English is collection of English poetry of Joseph Brodsky. The most comprehensive to date. The collection was released in 2000, edited by Ann Kjellberg. The full name of the collection is "Collected Poems in English, 1972-1999".

References

External links 
 James Wood. This poor man's marble // The Guardian, November 17, 2001.
 Sven Birkerts. A Subversive in Verse // The New York Times, September 17, 2000.
 Featured Author: Joseph Brodsky // Reviews From the Archives of The New York Times.
 L. Makkinnon. A Break from Dullness. The virtues of Brodsky’s English verse // Times Literary Supplement, June 22, 2001.
 Ch. Simic. Working for the Dictionary // The New York Review of Books, October 19, 2000.

Joseph Brodsky
English poetry collections